BCDS may refer to:

 Beaver Country Day School, a private independent school in Chestnut Hill, Massachusetts, US
 Buckley Country Day School, a private independent school in Roslyn, New York, US

See also
 BCD (disambiguation)